De optimo senatore (also The Counsellor and The Accomplished Senator) was a book by Wawrzyniec Goślicki (known in Latin as Goslicius) published in Venice in 1568, republished in Basel (1593), and then translated into English and published in 1598 and in 1607. 

Written in Latin and dedicated to a Polish King Sigismund II Augustus, the book describes the ideal statesman who is well versed in the humanities, as well as in economy, politics, and law. This theoretical treatise on the art of ruling postulated the importance of the senate as a body mediating between the monarch's absolute tendencies and noblemen's attempts to acquire more power.

It was a political and social classic, widely read at the time of its publication.

Notes

Bibliography 

 Aleksander Stępkowski (red.) O senatorze doskonałym studia Warszawa, Kancelaria Senatu 2009.
 Teresa Bałuk-Ulewiczowa, Goslicius' Ideal Senator and His Impact over the Centuries: Shakespearean Reflections. Kraków, PAU i UJ 2009.

1568 books
Political books
16th-century Latin books
Polish non-fiction books